Arduini may refer to:

People
 Federico Monti Arduini (born 1 December 1940), best known as Il Guardiano del Faro, Italian composer, producer and musician
 Massimo Arduini (born 1960), Italian auto racing driver
 Stefano Arduini (born 1956), Italian scholar of linguistics, rhetoric, semiotics and translation

Other
 Neviano degli Arduini, comune (municipality) in the Province of Parma in the Italian region Emilia-Romagna